Lozotaenia sciarrettae is a species of moth of the family Tortricidae. It is found in Ethiopia, where it is only known from the Bale Mountains.

The wingspan is 15–18 mm. The ground colour of the forewings is pale brownish cream with a slight yellowish admixture. The suffusions are yellow brown and the markings are yellowish brown.

Etymology
The species is named for Dr. Andrea Sciarretta, who first collected the species.

References

	

Moths described in 2010
Archipini